Philip Galma Godana (died 14 February 2015) was a Kenyan politician. He served as a member of parliament for Moyale Constituency.

On 14 February 2015 at 2 AM Godana's house in Syokimau, Nairobi, was entered by four persons out to rob the family according to the police. When they met with resistance Godana was shot and killed. Godana's mother, wife, and three children were present in the home during the incident but were left unharmed. The robbers were reported to have gotten away with electronics and cash. After the murder neighborhood residents protested due to rising insecurity.

Godana was married to Kule Galma, a Commissioner on the Independent Electoral and Boundaries Commission.

References

Year of birth missing
2015 deaths
Deaths by firearm in Kenya
Kenyan murder victims
Members of the National Assembly (Kenya)
People murdered in Kenya